Mirage is a video game developed by The Dream Designers for Windows 3.1 and published by Atlantis Interactive in 1995. A 3DO Interactive Multiplayer version was planned but never released.

Gameplay
Mirage is a puzzle game set in the Old West.

Reception
Next Generation reviewed the PC version of the game, rating it one star out of five, and stated that "Like areas that will randomly kill you?  Like spending minutes searching for hot-spots with a mouse?  No?  Well then, stay away from this."

Reviews
Power Unlimited - Oct, 1995
PC Player - Aug, 1995

References

1995 video games
Cancelled 3DO Interactive Multiplayer games
Windows games